Atitalaquía is a town and one of the 84 municipalities of Hidalgo, in central-eastern Mexico.

As of 2010 census, the municipality had a total population of 26,749. Atitalaquia is now part of Tula de Allende built-up area and while urbanization is still growing, about to be included in Mexico City Metro Area.

Demography

Populated places in Atitalaquia

See also
San Miguel Arcangel Parish (Atitalaquia)

References

Municipalities of Hidalgo (state)
Populated places in the Teotlalpan
Populated places in Hidalgo (state)